The Secular Citizen Group is an organisation which portrails the news of the Indian Christians.

Notes

External links
Official Website of The Secular Citizen Group

Christian mass media companies